The ATP Challenger Tour in 2020 was the secondary professional tennis circuit organized by the ATP. The 2020 ATP Challenger Tour calendar comprised 57 tournaments with prize money ranging from $35,000 up to $162,480. It was the 43rd edition of challenger tournaments cycle and 12th under the name of Challenger Tour.

The Challenger Tour was suspended between 13 March and 16 August due to the COVID-19 pandemic.

Schedule 
This was the complete schedule of events on the 2020 calendar, with player progression documented from the quarterfinals stage.

January

February

March

April – July
No tournaments were held due to the COVID-19 pandemic, see cancelled tournaments below.

August

September

October

November

Cancelled tournaments
The following tournaments were cancelled due to the COVID-19 pandemic.

Statistical information 
These tables present the number of singles (S) and doubles (D) titles won by each player and each nation during the season. The players/nations are sorted by: 1) total number of titles (a doubles title won by two players representing the same nation counts as only one win for the nation); 2) a singles > doubles hierarchy; 3) alphabetical order (by family names for players).

To avoid confusion and double counting, these tables should be updated only after an event is completed.

Titles won by player

Titles won by nation

Point distribution 
Points are awarded as follows:

1 Challenger 50 singles tournaments are only 32-player main draws but involve 24-player qualifying draws

Notes

References

External links 
 Official website
 Calendar

 
ATP Challenger Tour
ATP Challenger Tour